Charles Callis Western, 1st Baron Western (9 August 1767 – 4 November 1844), was a British landowner and Whig politician. He sat in the House of Commons for over forty years before his elevation to the peerage in 1833.

Background and education
Born at the family seat of Rivenhall Place in Essex, Western was the son of Charles Western and Frances Shirley, daughter and heiress of William Bolland. His father was killed in a chaise accident when Western was four-years-old, in which he was also present. He was educated at Newcombe's School in Hackney, Eton and Queens' College, Cambridge. When coming of age in 1788, he inherited Rivenhall Place, which had been in the Western family since the second half of the 17th century and commissioned Humphrey Repton to give the Tudor house a new facade. However, two years later he left Rivenhall to his uncle and purchased Felix Hall in Kelvedon.

Political career
Western was returned to parliament as one of two representatives for Maldon in 1790, a seat he held until 1806, when he was defeated by Benjamin Gaskell. However, Gaskell was unseated on petition the following year and Western was elected in his place. He continued to represent the constituency until 1812. The latter year he was returned for Essex, a seat he held until the constituency was abolished in the Great Reform Act of 1832. In parliament he was a supporter of agricultural and electoral reform. He lost his seat at the 1832 general election but the following year he was elevated to the peerage as Baron Western, of Rivenhall in the County of Essex.

Personal life
Lord Western never married and the title became extinct on his death at Felix Hall in November 1844, aged 77. He entailed his estates to his cousin Thomas Western, who was created a Baronet of Rivenhall in 1864.

References

External links 

 

1767 births
1844 deaths
Barons in the Peerage of the United Kingdom
People educated at Eton College
Alumni of Queens' College, Cambridge
Members of the Parliament of Great Britain for English constituencies
British MPs 1790–1796
British MPs 1796–1800
Members of the Parliament of the United Kingdom for English constituencies
UK MPs 1801–1802
UK MPs 1802–1806
UK MPs 1807–1812
UK MPs 1812–1818
UK MPs 1818–1820
UK MPs 1820–1826
UK MPs 1826–1830
UK MPs 1830–1831
UK MPs 1831–1832
UK MPs who were granted peerages
People educated at Newcome's School
People from Braintree District
Members of Parliament for Maldon
Peers of the United Kingdom created by William IV